U.S. Route 290 (US 290) is an east–west U.S. Highway located entirely within the state of Texas. Its western terminus is at Interstate 10 southeast of Segovia, and its eastern terminus is at Interstate 610 in northwest Houston.  It is the main highway between Houston and Austin and is a cutoff for travelers wanting to bypass San Antonio on Interstate 10. Throughout its length west of Austin, US 290 cuts across mountainous hills comprising the Texas Hill Country and the Edwards Plateau; between Austin and Houston, the highway then travels through gradually hilly grasslands and pine forests comprising the Gulf Coastal Plains.

In its original designation in 1926, US 290 originally traveled from US 80 in Scroggins Draw to terminate in San Antonio; though the highway still retains its designation from southeast of Segovia to Fredericksburg, I-10 and US 87 replaced much of the old routing in 1935. US 290 also received several minor re-routings east of Austin in 1951 that moved it further north, eliminating the old SH 20; the old routings were replaced by SH 71 and SH 21.

Route description
It begins to travel due east through rural farmlands in the Texas Hill Country before reaching Harper, where it is the main west–east road in the town. Afterwards, US 290 begins making slight curves as it crosses through several creeks and tributaries amidst additional farmland, where it eventually joins US 87 and runs as Main Street through Fredericksburg. The two highways travel together for eleven blocks in downtown Fredericksburg before US 87 splits south of US 290 at an intersection directly south of the National Museum of the Pacific War. Traveling due south, US 290 returns to an eastward path after crossing the Pedernales River, where it serves as a major artery for Fredericksburg's agricultural district, including Wildseed Farms. The highway then runs parallel to the Pedernales River, and after passing Stonewall, serves the south side of LBJ Ranch. As the Pedernales River arcs further north, US 290 continues east through several wineries before approaching Johnson City and bordering the north side of the LBJ Johnson City Unit. US 290 runs along Main Street throughout downtown Johnson City as it joins US 281 and heads south.

After traveling through additional hilly terrain, US 290 splits east from US 281 and twists through slopes in the Edwards Plateau, where an intersection with RM 3232 in the unincorporated community of Henly provides access to Pedernales Falls State Park. US 290 then curves south to serve downtown Dripping Springs, and then serves various residential areas as it crosses into southwest Austin. The highway then begins a concurrency with SH 71 at a series of traffic lights and travels through Austin's Oak Hill district before becoming a five-to-six-lane freeway. In the community of Sunset Valley, US 290 has interchanges with Loop 1 (MoPac Expressway) and Loop 360 (Capital of Texas Highway) providing access to the Barton Creek Greenbelt, and is then designated as Ben White Boulevard while it travels through south-central Austin, crossing the UPRR Austin Subdivision railroad in the process. Shortly afterward, US 290 splits north from SH 71 in a stack interchange to run concurrent with I-35.

Upon beginning its concurrency with I-35, US 290 travels through the suburban Riverside and Travis Heights districts while also serving St. Edward's University. After crossing the Colorado River, I-35 and US 290 cut between downtown Austin and the East Cesar Chavez district, being the only major highways to serve the Austin Convention Center and the Texas State Capitol. US 290 then splits due east from I-35 southeast of the former Highland Mall as a four-lane freeway. Not long after, US 290 has an interchange with US 183 and promptly becomes a tolled freeway designated as the Manor Expressway. It then travels through much of industrial East Austin and Daffan before reverting to a four-lane divided highway after an interchange with SH 130, less than a mile shy of Manor. US 290 then makes its way through rolling meadows dotted with suburban areas in northeast Travis County, then travels through southern Elgin where it forms a brief concurrency with SH 95. Passing through the town of McDade, US 290 cuts through piney woods north of the Lost Pines Forest and has an interchange with SH 21 west of Paige. US 290 continues east, running parallel to the Austin and Northwestern Railroad east branch until approaching Giddings, where the highway travels along Austin Street, intersecting US 77 near the town's center.

US 290 travels southeast to Ledbetter, where it then travels through additional grassland before bounding northeast to Burton. The highway then enters Brenham, where it briefly joins SH 36 to serve Blinn College and bypass the city as a four-lane freeway. After exiting Brenham, US 290 runs parallel to the old Washington County Railroad and goes through Chappell Hill to serve every historic landmark there, then crosses the Brazos River to move through a rural auto-industrial area. SH 6 joins US 290 north of Hempstead, where the two highways become a four-lane freeway notable for its role as a hurricane evacuation route. Running parallel to the Houston and Texas Central Railway from the north, US 290 finally comes right next to it roughly  prior to intersecting SH 99. The highway is then designated as Northwest Freeway (legally as the Ronald Reagan Memorial Highway) as it travels through the suburb of Cypress, later splitting off SH 6 to the south in the suburb of Jersey Village. Following an interchange with the Sam Houston Tollway, US 290 serves several businesses and neighborhoods in northwest Houston before terminating at an interchange with I-610 west of the Lazybrook/Timbergrove district.

History

Texas State Highways 20 and 20A (1917–1951)

On June 21, 1917, the department's Office of State Highway Engineer issued a proposal for the state highway system. The proposal included SH 20 originally planned as the Austin-Houston Highway between Austin and Houston by way of Bastrop, Giddings, Brenham, and Hempstead. On July 17, 1917, the planned route was extended from Austin to Brady by way of Burnet, Llano, and Mason. On December 17, 1918, SH 20 was rerouted away from Bastrop, with the section from Austin to Bastrop transferred to SH 3A. The section of SH 20 from Hempstead to Houston was cancelled as it was already part of the Gulf Division Branch of SH 2.

On November 19, 1917, an intercounty highway from Austin through Johnson City to Fredericksburg was designated. On January 20, 1919, this was changed to an auxiliary route of Highway 20, Highway 20A. The highway routes remained unchanged in a 1922 proposal that rated both routes as "second class" under a three-tier system.

On August 21, 1923, SH 20 in the new highway system was routed over the previously proposed Highway 20A from Fredericksburg to Austin and then over the proposed Highway 20 to Hempstead as a second class highway. The old route to Leander was cancelled, and northwest of there became part of SH 43 when it was extended southwest. In 1924, the state highway department assumed responsibility to maintain all state highways which were previously maintained by the counties. The following year, state lawmakers vest the department with the authority to acquire right of way, survey, plan, and build highways. On August 10, 1925, SH 20 was given a third class extension to Kerrville. On February 20, 1928, SH 20 was given an auxiliary route SH 20A from Fredericksburg to a point on the highway between Kerrville and Junction. All of the highway from Fredericksburg to Hempstead was classified as a "secondary federal highway". The portion between Fredericksburg and Kerrville along with the new auxiliary route were classified as "state highways" eligible for state aid only.

On March 19, 1930, the SH 20 designation was dropped over the Fredericksburg to Kerrville highway (replaced by an extended SH 81) and extended instead over the auxiliary route SH 20A. In 1933 the road was described between Fredericksburg and Hempstead as paved except for the portion in Hays County around Dripping Springs and a short portion west of Elgin that were described as surfaced. The portion west of Fredericksburg toward Junction was graded earth. In 1935, US 290 was routed over SH 20 except for the portion between Austin and Paige where US 290 was routed further south through Bastrop. By 1936, the formerly surfaced portion west of Elgin had been paved, but the Hays County portion remained merely surfaced. West of Fredericksburg, the Gillespie County portion had been surfaced while the Kimble County portion remained as an improved earth road. On September 26, 1939, the SH 20 designation was dropped along all portions of the route running along US 290 as a result of that day's general redescription of the state highway system, leaving SH 20 as a greatly shortened route running from Austin to US 290 near Paige. On May 23, 1951, US 290 was relocated away from Bastrop northward along SH 20 which was then decommissioned.

Other original routings
In its original designation in the late 1920s, US 290 traveled from an intersection with US 80 northwest of Scroggins Draw to an eastern terminus in San Antonio. On March 1, 1935, US 290 was re-routed further north to terminate in Houston, and the previous alignment from Fredericksburg to San Antonio was redesignated as US 87. Following the 1935 re-routing, US 290 traveled through much of its present-day routing, with the exception of a designation traveling through Austin and Bastrop before following the Old San Antonio Road to Paige. On May 23, 1951, US 290 was rerouted further north to Elgin, while the original routing was transferred to SH 71 from Austin to Bastrop, and SH 21 from Bastrop to Paige.

Through Austin, US 290 originally followed Lamar Boulevard and Cesar Chavez Street to I-35 (then US 81). On May 30, 1951, US 290 and SH 71 were both rerouted onto their present-day designations on Ben White Boulevard, and the old designations were transferred to Loop 343.

On November 21, 1991, the US 290 designation was deleted between Scroggins Draw and its current western terminus southeast of Segovia due to being supplanted by I-10. Much of the old route near Sheffield became SH 290. Other former alignments that are part of the state highway system include the Fort Stockton and Balmorhea business routes of Interstate 10, RM 1312 between Ozona and Sonora, RM 3130 between Sonora and Roosevelt, and RM 1674 between Roosevelt and Junction.

Freeway upgrades in later years

Austin

In Austin, US 290 initially received two different freeway upgrades; the first took place circa the 1970s from the north interchange with I-35 near Highland Mall to US 183 east of the Coronado Hills district, while the second took place in the late 1990s and early 2000s from the Williamson Creek crossing in the Oak Hill district to the south interchange with I-35 near St. Edward's University. In 2012, the Central Texas Regional Mobility Authority began constructing a third freeway upgrade from the existing interchange with US 183 to the crossing at Gilleland Creek west of Manor; this designation, known as the Manor Expressway, was completed on May 17, 2014.

Houston
Prior to construction of the Northwest Freeway, US 290 through Houston followed Hempstead Highway, which runs parallel to the freeway approximately one-half mile to the southwest. The eastern terminus of US 290 was also approximately one mile to the southeast at the intersection of Hempstead Highway, Washington Avenue and Old Katy Road.

The interchange with I-610 and first part of frontage roads opened in 1963.  The first freeway section opened in 1975. In 1982, freeway main lanes completed to just inside Beltway 8. In 1990, the stack interchange with Beltway 8 were completed. From 1984 to 2005, the main lanes outside Beltway 8 were completed.

The freeway was constructed to only three lanes in each direction, but a major investment study in 2002 requested expansion to five lanes in each direction inside Beltway 8 and four lanes in each direction from Beltway 8 to the then-proposed SH 99.

Future
In 2011, two members of the U.S. House of Representatives, John Culberson and Michael T. McCaul, asked TxDOT to advocate for the relabeling of US 290 as an interstate highway.

Due to heavy congestion on US 290 in Austin's Oak Hill district, in 2022 CTRMA began upgrading US 290 to a freeway between the east intersection of Circle Drive and the existing end of the current freeway at Old Fredericksburg Road; this expansion is known as the Oak Hill Parkway.

In Houston, the Harris County Toll Road Authority is planning to construct toll managed lanes along and adjacent to the US 290 right-of-way, to be called the Hempstead Tollway.

Major intersections
The entire route is in Texas.

Business routes
US 290 currently has three business routes and one former loop.

Dripping Springs

Loop 64 is a former business loop of US 290 through the town of Dripping Springs. The highway was designated in 1958 along the former route of US 290 through the town along Mercer Street when the main highway was re-routed two blocks to the south. Loop 64 was removed from the state highway system in 2003 and returned to the city of Dripping Springs for maintenance.<ref name=

The Loop 64 designation was previously used for a highway in Henderson County. This Loop 64 was designated in 1939, running from SH 31 southeast to a point on the St. Louis Southwestern Railroad in Trinidad. The highway was cancelled and combined with FM 764 in 1948.

Brenham

Business U.S. Highway 290-F (Bus. US 290) is the original routing of US 290 through the town of Brenham. The route was designated as Loop 318 throughout its entire length on January 18, 1960. On February 28, 1973, the section from then-SH 90 westward became part of SH 105. It was established in 1990 when the mainline of US 290 was rerouted along with SH 36 around the western and southern sides of Brenham. The routing begins to the west of town at an intersection with SH 36. The business route continues east into downtown on Main Street. Before reaching downtown, the route splits into two parallel one-way streets: Main Street carrying westbound traffic and Alamo Street carrying eastbound traffic. It passes through downtown, meeting the business routing of State Highway 36 and the western terminus of SH 105. At this intersection, the business route turns south on Market Street, and continues out of Brenham, rejoining the mainline US 290 near an intersection with FM 577.

Hempstead–Hockley

Business U.S. Highway 290-H (Bus. US 290) is the original routing of US 290 through the towns of Hempstead, Waller, and Hockley. This route was designated between 1995 and 1998 in stages as a limited-access bypass route was constructed to the north of these towns. It begins at the interchange with US 290 and SH 6 and travels south into Hempstead along 10th Street. At an intersection with SH 159, the business route turns east onto Austin Street and subsequently runs parallel to the adjacent railroad after leaving Hempstead city limits. It intersects several amenities in Prairie View before serving downtown Waller while designated as Hempstead Road. After passing through several industrial facilities and serving downtown Hockley, the business route becomes US 290's southbound frontage road just prior to the interchange with Badtke Road.

Cypress

Business U.S. Highway 290-L (Bus. US 290) is the original routing of US 290 through the town of Cypress. The route was designated in 1993 as a limited-access bypass was built to the northeast of the original routing.

References

External links

Endpoints of U.S. Highway 290

90-2
90-2
2
290
Transportation in Kimble County, Texas
Transportation in Gillespie County, Texas
Transportation in Blanco County, Texas
Transportation in Hays County, Texas
Transportation in Travis County, Texas
Transportation in Bastrop County, Texas
Transportation in Lee County, Texas
Transportation in Fayette County, Texas
Transportation in Washington County, Texas
Transportation in Waller County, Texas
Transportation in Harris County, Texas